Snøhetta is the highest mountain in the Dovrefjell mountain range in Norway. At , it is the highest mountain in Norway outside the Jotunheimen range, making it the 24th highest peak in Norway, based on a  topographic prominence cutoff. At , its topographic prominence is the third highest in Norway.

The mountain is located in the Dovrefjell mountains in northern Innlandet county in Dovre Municipality. The mountain lies inside Dovrefjell-Sunndalsfjella National Park and it is the highest peak in the park. It is surrounded by several other mountains including Brunkollen to the east; Einøvlingseggen to the south; Skredahøin Bruri, Nordre Svånåtinden, and Storstyggesvånåtinden to the southwest; and Store Langvasstinden, Larstinden, and Drugshøi to the west.

The mountain has several peaks:

Vesttoppen and Stortoppen are easily available by hiking or skiing, and traveling from Stortoppen, Midttoppen is easily accessible. Traversing Midttoppen, via Hettpiggen and to Vesttoppen requires climbing with a rope.

On Stortoppen there is a radio link station, originally installed by the Norwegian Army, and now serving primarily civilian purposes. The station and its emergency diesel generator, as well as a nearby helipad, detract somewhat from the aesthetics of the summit. For this reason, many recommend Vesttoppen as a better destination.

A small monument for the Norwegian philosopher, humourist, author and mountaineer Peter Wessel Zapffe is located near the summit of Vesttoppen. 

Under good conditions in both summer and winter, the ascent is relatively easy. Common starting points are the DNT-cabins Reinheim, Snøheim, or Åmotdalshytta.

History
Snøhetta was visited for the first time in 1798 as part of a scientific trip to the area. At that time it was assumed that was the highest summit in Norway, because the Jotunheimen area with its higher peaks was rather inaccessible and unresearched, while Snøhetta is visible from the traditional travel route Oslo-Trondheim across the  Dovrefjell mountains. The expression "until the Dovre mountains fall" was used in the oath sworn during the Norwegian Constituent Assembly in 1814, when Norway formed an independent nation after being in a union with Denmark for hundreds of years.

Etymology
The name is a compound of the Norwegian word snø which means "snow" and the finite form of hette which means "hood", thus the name is translated as "the mountain with a hood of snow".

Media gallery

References

External links
 Annotated photo-panoramas
 Snøhetta

Guidebook

Mountains of Innlandet
Dovre